Utopian is the debut studio album recorded by Canadian singer and songwriter Virginia to Vegas, released through Wax Records, Ultra Records, and Universal Music Group on December 2, 2016. It includes the Platinum-certified single, "We Are Stars", and the top-10 pop radio hit, "Lights Out".

Background
Derik Baker began his career as a songwriter before focusing on singing, at which point he adopted the stage name Virginia to Vegas after failing to garner attention using his birth name. He was discovered on YouTube in 2013 by Wax Records executive Jamie Appleby and signed to the label that year. His debut single, "We Are Stars", was released in January 2014. The song, which features labelmate, Alyssa Reid, reached the top 15 on the Canadian Hot 100 and was certified Platinum by Music Canada.

A follow-up single, "Don't Fight the Music", was released in September 2014 which failed to replicate its predecessor's success. Both songs were included on an extended play, titled Vol. I, which was released that November. His radio success with the singles contributed to him being nominated for Pop Artist or Group of the Year at the 2015 Sirius XM Indie Awards. Over the next two years, Virginia to Vegas continued recording new material and released two further singles, which are included on Utopian. The album was announced in November 2016 and was released in Canada on December 2, 2016.

Track listing

Notes

Chart positions

Singles

Release history

References

2016 debut albums
Universal Music Group albums